Taphrotopium sulcifrons is a  beetle in the genus Taphrotopium. It is found in Europe.

Distribution
Taphrotopium sulcifrons can be found in central and eastern Europe. However it is Endangered in the Czech Republic.

References

Brentidae
Beetles described in 1797